
AD 79 (LXXIX) was a common year starting on Friday (link will display the full calendar) of the Julian calendar. At the time, it was known as the Year of the Consulship of Titus and Vespasianus (or, less frequently, year 832 Ab urbe condita). The denomination AD 79 for this year has been used since the early medieval period, when the Anno Domini calendar era became the prevalent method in Europe for naming years.

Events

By place

Roman Empire 
 Vespasianus Augustus and Titus Caesar Vespasianus become Roman Consuls.
 June 23 – Emperor Vespasian dies of fever from diarrhea; his last words on his deathbed are: "I think I'm turning into a god." Titus succeeds his father as Roman emperor. Titus' Jewish mistress, Berenice, comes to join him in Rome, but he exiles her to please the Senate.
 August 24 – Eruption of Mount Vesuvius: Mount Vesuvius erupts, destroying Pompeii, Herculaneum, Stabiae, and Oplontis. The Roman navy (based at Misenum), commanded by Pliny the Elder, evacuates refugees. Pliny dies after inhaling volcanic fumes.
 Roman conquest of Britain: Gnaeus Julius Agricola campaigns in Britain:
 Chester is founded as a castrum or Roman fort with the name Deva Victrix. The fortress is built by Legio II Adiutrix and contains barracks, granaries, military baths and headquarters.
 Mamucium (the first Manchester) is founded as a frontier fort and settlement in the North West of England, a distance to the north of Chester.
 Agricola enters Caledonia (modern-day Scotland) but is resisted by the natives.

China 
 A commission of scholars canonizes the text of works of Confucius and his school.
</onlyinclude>

Births 
 He of Han, Chinese emperor (d. 106)
 Ma Rong, Chinese poet and politician (d. 166)

Deaths 
 June 23 – Vespasian, Roman emperor (b. AD 9)
 August 16 – Ma, Chinese empress of the Han Dynasty (b. AD 40)
 August 25 – Caesius Bassus, Roman poet (died in the eruption of Mount Vesuvius)
 August 25 – Drusilla, daughter of Herod (died in the eruption of Vesuvius)
 August 25 – Pliny the Elder, Roman writer and scientist (b. AD 23)
 Apollinaris of Ravenna, Syrian bishop and martyr (approximate date)
 Aulus Caecina Alienus, Roman general and politician (executed)
 Tiberius Claudius Balbilus, Roman politician and astrologer (b. AD 3)
 Titus Clodius Eprius Marcellus, Roman politician (committed suicide)

References 

0079

als:70er#Johr 79